"Pine Robbers" were loosely organized, criminal, gangs and marauders who were British sympathizers and Loyalists during the American Revolutionary War and used the Pine Barrens of New Jersey to wreak havoc in the area. The pine barrens created densely forested terrain where concealment of guerrilla and criminal activities could easily be carried out.

Guerrilla and criminal activities
While the Tories, who had received their land from King George III, were amiable neighbors during the day and enemies of the Patriots by night, the pine robbers were disgruntled British sailors who had jumped ship. They banded together with local outlaws to burn and loot throughout the New Jersey Pine Barrens. The pine robbers were commonly known to commit crimes against Patriots and, sometimes, Loyalists.

Fagan Gang
One of the most infamous pine robber gangs was the Fagan Gang led by Loyalist leader Jacob Fagan and his associate Lewis Fenton.

John Bacon and the "Refugees"
John Bacon was one of the more notorious Loyalist leaders of the pine robbers. In December 1782, Bacon and his gang, the "Refugees" were involved in the Battle of Cedar Bridge, where a surprise attack by Captain Edward Thomas of the Mansfield Militia and Captain Richard Shreeve of the Burlington County Light Horse forced Bacon to quickly build a makeshift barricade at Cedar Bridge. The Patriot forces charged the Refugees, but Bacon and three gang members escaped.

On April 3, 1783, John Bacon was surrounded by the Patriot militia from Burlington, New Jersey, while drinking in a local tavern. With no chance of escape, he was bayoneted and shot to death.

See also
De Lancey's Brigade
Doan Gang
Harpe brothers
New Jersey Volunteers

References

Ward, Harry M; Between the Lines: Banditti of the American Revolution;  Santa Barbara, California;  Praeger; (2002).

External links
The Refugee John Bacon (Loyalist leader of the Pine Robbers)
Egg Harbor City to Pleasant Mills

Loyalist military units in the American Revolution
Pine Barrens (New Jersey)
New Jersey in the American Revolution
American outlaws